Shaquille O'Neal (born 1972), is an American former professional basketball player and sports analyst.

Shaquille may also refer to:

Shaquille (given name), includes variants Shaquill and Shaquil
Shaquille (TV series), 2005 series featuring Shaquille O'Neal

See also
Shakeel (disambiguation)
Shaq (disambiguation)